Phelps is an unincorporated community in Lawrence County, Missouri, United States.  It lies along former U.S. Route 66 (Route 96), twenty-one miles east of Carthage.

A post office called Phelps was established in 1857, and remained in operation until 1864. The community has the name of William Wallace Phelps, a state legislator.

References

Unincorporated communities in Lawrence County, Missouri
Populated places established in the 1830s
Unincorporated communities in Missouri
1830s establishments in Missouri